Juan Manuel Martínez (born October 25, 1985), nicknamed Burrito (in English, "Little Donkey"), is an Argentine football forward who plays for Almirante Brown. He also holds a Portuguese passport. Martínez is best known for his agility, pace on the ball and brilliant dribbling skills.

Club career
Martínez made his professional debut for Vélez Sársfield on October 1, 2003, in a 2–1 win over Talleres de Córdoba, for the Clausura tournament. Later, he was part of the 2005 Clausura winning squad, playing 13 games and scoring 1 goal. The goal he scored was Vélez's first in that championship, in the fourth match day victory over Lanús (2–1).

After his first period at Vélez, Martínez was loaned to Argentinos Juniors. With his new team, he played 10 games during the 2005 Apertura, suffering a knee injury in the 11th fixture that left him out for almost the entire rest of the season. He returned for the last game of the 2006 Clausura, coming on as a substitute on a 1–0 victory over Colón.

In 2007, after a half-a-year period back at Vélez, Martínez was loaned to Colombian club Cúcuta Deportivo. With the team, he was part of the Copa Libertadores semifinalist campaign. Subsequently, he spent the 2007–08 season on loan at Al-Shabab Riyadh in Saudi Arabia.

Martínez returned to Vélez Sársfield for the 2008–09 Argentine Primera División season. Upon his return, he won the Argentine league for the second time, by being part of the 2009 Clausura squad. The forward played 9 games and scored 1 goal during the tournament (against Colón in a 4–2 away win, helping the team come back from a 0–2). He ended the tournament as a starter after replacing injured Jonathan Cristaldo for the last two games, against Lanús and Huracán, which defined the championship.

The 2010 Apertura was Martínez' best season with Vélez. Up until that tournament, he had scored 6 goals in 91 league games for the club, and had never been a regular starter. However, in that Apertura he started in all 19 games, scoring 10 goals. He also achieved his first hat-trick in Argentina, in Vélez' 6–0 victory over Colón in the 10th fixture. Moreover, his last goal of the championship, in the 2–0 away victory over Racing, was defined by various sources as "Maradona styled". Martínez dribbled with the ball from behind the half-way line, passing 6 rival players in the process, to finally beat the opposing goalkeeper. His team finished the tournament as runner-up to Estudiantes de La Plata.

Due to his performances throughout 2010, Martínez was selected by the Argentine Sports Journalists Circle as the best player of the Argentine league for that year, therefore sharing the Footballer of the Year of Argentina award with Lionel Messi (best Argentine playing abroad). In January 2011, the striker renewed his contract with Vélez until June 2013.

In 2012, after Corinthians won the 2012 Copa Libertadores they hired Juan Manuel Martínez,  however he did not feature regularly for team. He entered for a few minutes in the match against Chelsea F.C. in the 2012 FIFA Club World Cup.

Martínez joined Boca Juniors in January 2013. The beginning of the 2015 season saw Martínez injured for much of the time and fallen down the squad depth chart due to the loan signing of Dani Osvaldo and subsequent arrival of Carlos Tevez. By early July Martínez wanted to contribute to the squad but found it increasingly difficult to do so. With Tevez's return to Boca being the final straw, he approached the Boca front office and asked for his contract to be rescinded. Martínez trained with Vélez Sarsfield as he worked to sign with a new club during the summer of 2015.

On 13 August 2015, Martínez joined Real Salt Lake as a Designated Player.

Martínez and Salt Lake agreed to mutually terminate his contract at the club on 7 December 2016.

On 18 January 2019, Martínez joined Club Almagro. After three years at Almagro, Martínez moved to fellow league club Almirante Brown in February 2022.

International career
In November 2010, Martínez was called to take part in the Argentina national team that will solely consist of Argentine League players. They will train twice a week and have friendly matches leading up to the 2011 Copa América.

The striker received his first call-up by coach Sergio Batista on January 25, 2011, for a friendly match against Portugal. He was brought down in the penalty area during injury time to win a penalty for his side from which Messi scored the winner.

International appearances and goals

Career statistics

Honours

Club
Vélez Sársfield
Argentine Primera División (3): 2005 Clausura, 2009 Clausura, 2011 Clausura
Corinthians
FIFA Club World Cup: 2012

Individual
Footballer of the Year of Argentina (1): 2010

References

External links
 Profile at Vélez Sársfield official website 
 
 
 

1985 births
Living people
People from Viedma
Argentine footballers
Argentina international footballers
Argentine expatriate footballers
Association football wingers
Association football forwards
Argentine Primera División players
Campeonato Brasileiro Série A players
Major League Soccer players
Saudi Professional League players
Categoría Primera A players
Club Atlético Vélez Sarsfield footballers
Argentinos Juniors footballers
Cúcuta Deportivo footballers
Al-Shabab FC (Riyadh) players
Sport Club Corinthians Paulista players
Boca Juniors footballers
Real Salt Lake players
Club Agropecuario Argentino players
Club Atlético Independiente footballers
Club Almagro players
Club Almirante Brown footballers
Designated Players (MLS)
Expatriate footballers in Colombia
Expatriate footballers in Saudi Arabia
Expatriate footballers in Brazil
Argentine expatriate sportspeople in Saudi Arabia
Argentine expatriate sportspeople in Colombia
Argentine expatriate sportspeople in Brazil